Harrison Tyler may refer to:

 Harrison Parker Tyler (1904–1974), American author, poet, and film critic
 Harrison Ruffin Tyler (born 1928), American chemical engineer, businessperson, and preservationist

See also
Harry Tyler (disambiguation)
Harold Tyler (disambiguation)
Harrison and Tyler, comedians